Gabriela Concepcion (née Roldan) is a Filipino television host, actress, lawyer, and professor. She is the wife of former University of the Philippines president, lawyer Danilo Concepcion. A hisbiscus hybrid species was named after her by the University of the Philippines Los Baños.

Education and career

Concepcion graduated from the University of the Philippines College of Arts and Sciences in 1985 finishing her Bachelor of Arts in Political Science, magna cum laude. She continued studying at the University of the Philippines to attain her law degree in 1990, and was admitted to the bar a year after. She is a member of the international honor societies of Phi Kappa Phi and Pi Gamma Mu. She teaches at the Pamantasan ng Lungsod ng Maynila College of Law, Ateneo de Manila John Gokongwei School of Management, and at the University of the Philippines Diliman. She is a member of the Movie and Television Review and Classification Board (MTRCB), the Philippine government agency responsible for the classification and review of television programs, motion pictures, and home videos.

Television and film credits

References

External links 
 

University of the Philippines Diliman alumni
University of the Philippines Manila alumni
Living people
Academic staff of Pamantasan ng Lungsod ng Maynila
Academic staff of Ateneo de Manila University
Academic staff of the University of the Philippines Diliman
Filipino women lawyers
GMA Network personalities
GMA Integrated News and Public Affairs people
Filipino film actresses
Year of birth missing (living people)
21st-century Filipino lawyers